Pod Point is a UK provider of electric vehicle charging station. It provides charging units for home, business and public use. Since forming in 2009, Pod Point has manufactured and sold over 137,000 charging points. It has also developed one of the UK's largest public networks, connecting EV drivers with hundreds of charging stations nationwide at locations such as Tesco, Lidl, Sainsbury's, Center Parcs and Southern Rail. Since 2014, when it signed a partnership with automaker Nissan, it also operates in Norway.

Pod Point operates the charge point “Pod Point Network” which is accessible via a smartphone app.

In 2018, Tesco, Volkswagen and Pod Point teamed up to install electric vehicle charging points in over 600 stores by 2022, to create the UK’s largest retail EV charging network.

In 2018-2019, Pod Point launched its Electric Schools initiative. Up to thirty primary schools in highly polluted parts of the UK were given the opportunity to claim a free 7 kW Pod Point charging point and installation. The initiative was also launched to help inspire young learners on how EV technology will revolutionise the way we travel and use energy.

Pod Point also signed a deal with Mitie in 2019, the UK’s leading facilities management and professional services company to install 800 electric vehicle (EV) chargepoints at its offices and staff homes.

In February 2020, Pod Point was acquired by EDF Energy through a newly-formed joint venture with Legal and General Capital.

In August 2020, Pod Point launched a new video series on YouTube called 'Electric Insights'. Pod Point interviews key industry players about electrification, sustainability and renewables. Guests include, Graeme Cooper - National Grid, Natasha Robinson - Head of OZEV, The Met Office, DPD and Volkswagen Financial Services.

History 
Pod Point was founded in 2009 by the current CEO, Erik Fairbairn, and Chairman, Peter Hiscocks.  They both worked together previously to found and then sell the supercar club Ecurie25.

In 2014 Pod Point raised £1.5 million in an equity crowdfunding round on the Seedrs platform at a pre-money valuation of £16 million.

In 2015 the firm started its Open Charge network of public electric vehicle charging stations in the United Kingdom. This allowed drivers to charge their vehicles by using a smartphone application in place of an RFID card.

Later in the year, Pod Point raised £1.9 million in an equity crowdfunding campaign on the Crowdcube platform at a pre-money valuation of £26 million. This was supplemented by £0.37 million raised through the issuing of mini-bonds on the same platform.

In 2017, the business raised a further £9 million at a pre-money valuation of £35 million. Venture capital firm Draper Esprit led the financing round with an investment of £5 million. The remainder of the funding amount was made up of £0.5 million angel investment, £1.5 million raised in an equity crowdfunding campaign on Crowdcube and £2 million venture debt raised from Barclays.

In 2018, Pod Point announced that it would be one of the first firms to sell 150 kW rapid chargers in the UK, stating that these would be necessary to support plug-in vehicles with faster charging capabilities and longer range batteries that it anticipated coming to market in the medium term.

A couple of months later, the company installed 67 electric vehicle chargepoints at Skanska’s UK Headquarters in Hertfordshire, thought to be the largest single installation of electric vehicle chargepoints in the United Kingdom at the time.

Transport secretary Grant Shapps opened a Pod Point-installed hub with 27 charge points at Hatfield Station in 2020. The installation at Hatfield station marked a milestone in a wide-ranging station improvements programme being undertaken by Govia Thameslink Railway, which encompasses more than 230 stations and over 1,000 individual projects. The EV installation at Hatfield aimed to provide additional accessibility and convenience for customers using the Great Northern and Thameslink station. As part of the project, 12 charging points were also installed at Haywards Heath station.

In 2021, Pod Point and LIDL GB reached the 100th rapid charger milestone. The partnership is set to install 250 rapid chargers across the UK by 2022.

In June 2022, Pod Point and BMW Group UK signed a three year deal, which added Pod Point as a preferred EV home chargepoint supplier for BMW and MINI retail customers.

Business & Industry Awards 
In 2015 and 2016, Pod Point ranked 86th and 92nd respectively, in the Sunday Times Tech Track 100 league table of the 100 privately owned British technology companies with the fastest-growing sales over the previous three years.

In 2017 Pod Point was awarded the ‘Tech start up of the year’ award at the Evening Standard Business Awards. The other shortlisted nominees were Darktrace, Citymapper and Monzo.

Also in 2017, Pod Point received the ‘Hottest Green Tech Startup of The Year’ award at the Europas Awards.

See also
 Electric vehicles
 Charging station
 Electric vehicle network
 Battery electric vehicle
 Plug-in hybrid electric vehicle

References

External links 
 

Charging stations
British companies established in 2009
Companies based in the London Borough of Islington
Electric vehicles in the United Kingdom